Alina Goreac (born 28 September 1952) is a retired Romanian artistic gymnast who represented Romania at the 1972 Olympic Games. During her career she medaled on all four events (floor, balance beam, vault and uneven bars) at European championships and was the 1977 University Games all around and uneven bars champion. Since 1981 she has been a gymnastics coach.

References

External links
List of competitive results

1952 births
Living people
People from Lugoj
Romanian female artistic gymnasts
Gymnasts at the 1972 Summer Olympics
Olympic gymnasts of Romania
Romanian gymnastics coaches
Universiade medalists in gymnastics
Universiade gold medalists for Romania
Medalists at the 1977 Summer Universiade
20th-century Romanian women